Cabomba furcata is a species of aquatic plant in the water shield family known by the common names red cabomba and forked fanwort. It is native to Central and  South America and as far north as Cuba and the tip of Florida. It reaches a maximum height between 30 and 80 cm and is up to 8 cm wide. It bears purple flowers.

This is used as an aquarium plant. Carbon dioxide addition is usually necessary, mostly because this plant requires high light and regular fertilization for optimal growth.

Cabomba furcata has been reported as an invasive species in Kerala, India.  Even though the rapidly growing cabomba are treat to eyes , it becomes hazardous for the water bodies due to its active stem propagation which prevents light from entering the water. It suffocates the water bodies economically and ecologically hindering the growth of native aquatic plants and freshwater fish. Red cabomba requires huge quantity of oxygen, resulting in decline of biodiversity and water quality.

References 

Ørgaard, M. (1991). The genus Cabomba (Cabombaceae) - a taxonomic study. Nordic Journal of Botany 11: 179-203
Wiersema, J. H. (1989). A new species of Cabomba (Cabombaceae) from tropical America. Ann. Missouri Bot. Gard. 76:1167–1168.

External links 
 USDA Plants Profile

Nymphaeales
Flora of the United States
Freshwater plants